Kingo Sunen is a fictional character appearing in American comic books published by Marvel Comics. He first appeared in The Eternals #11 (May 1977) and was created by Jack Kirby. He is depicted as a member of the Eternals, a fictional race in the Marvel Comics universe.

The character made his first on-screen appearance in the Marvel Cinematic Universe in the 2021 film Eternals in which he is played by Kumail Nanjiani.

Publication history

Kingo was created by Jack Kirby. He first appeared in The Eternals #11 (May 1977). Just like all the other Eternals Kirby created him as a mixture of science fiction mixed with classic mythology, similarly to what he did when he created the New Gods for DC Comics in 1971.

Fictional character biography
Like all other Eternals was created by the Celestials around a million years ago on earth on early humanity. Like others of his species he was created as a result of the many genetic experiments the Celestials did on Earth-616. Another of these experiments are the devious Deviants who are also the primary antagonists of Eternals.

Kingo spent centuries in Japan learning the ways of the Samurai, and is one of the most skilled swordsmen on the planet. In the present day and age, he has parlayed his skills into becoming a major action film star in Japan.

He later reappeared, after Sprite's mindwiping of the Eternals, once again, as a major Japanese film icon, now an actor, director, and producer, who is making a film in San Francisco starring the Blob, finding himself drawn to the Dreaming Celestial.

Powers and abilities
Kingo Sunen presumably has all the typical powers of Eternals—immortality, super-strength, flight, energy projection, and molecular manipulation. However, he eschews the use of these powers in battle, preferring to fight in the traditional manner of the Samurai. Kingo uses a sword forged by the Eternal Phastos that can cut through nearly any material.

In other media 
 Kingo appears in Eternals, portrayed by Kumail Nanjiani. Kingo was sent to Earth with other Eternals to save humanity from the Deviants, but they disbanded when they felt that the Deviant threat had abated. Subsequently, Kingo, who can project cosmic energy projectiles from his hands, became a popular Bollywood film star, and his descendants over the course of multiple generations. He reunited with the Eternals when the Deviant threat returned. When Ikaris revealed their true mission was to protect the Earth so that it could function as a womb for the Celestial Tiamut, whose emergence would destroy the Earth, Kingo abandoned the mission. However, after this catastrophe was averted, Kingo, Phastos, and Sersi were kidnapped by the Celestial Arishem, who intended to analyze their memories to judge whether humanity is worthy to live.
 Kingo appears in the video game Marvel Future Fight.

References

Characters created by Jack Kirby
Comics characters introduced in 1977
Eternals (comics)
Fictional actors
Fictional swordfighters in comics
Marvel Comics characters with accelerated healing
Marvel Comics characters with superhuman strength